The city of Ottawa, Canada held municipal elections on December 7, 1925 to elect members of the 1926 Ottawa City Council.

Mayor of Ottawa
Incumbent mayor John P. Balharrie is re-elected without opposition.

Plebiscites
There were four plebiscites put to the voters. All four would fail. 

Property owners struck down a proposal from cross town tracks. 

Voters also struck down a proposal to lengthen council terms to two-years. All but Central and St. George Wards were against. 

Property owners voted against a money debenture bylaw for $12,000 for the West End Market

Ottawa Board of Control
(4 elected)

Ottawa City Council
(2 elected from each ward)

References
The Ottawa Evening Citizen, Dec 8, 1925, pg 1, 9, 12

Municipal elections in Ottawa
1925 elections in Canada
1920s in Ottawa
1925 in Ontario